is a Japanese manga series written and illustrated by Ami Shibata. It was adapted into a 26-episode anime television series called  which was broadcast on TV Tokyo from October 5, 1999 to March 28, 2000. In some markets, the series is known as Bucky: The Incredible Kid, Bucky: Searching for World 0 or simply Bucky.

Story
The story is set in a place called Parallel Planet, located above the sky and down the sea. This planet is divided into twelve worlds, in the manner of a clock. In the center of this clock is the Needle Tower, World Zero, where time does not pass. In each world there is a Great Child, something like the guardian of that world. The Great Child is always accompanied by a spirit, an explosive, spherical side-kick that helps defeat the Troublemonsters.

Baku (Bucky in some versions) was a normal boy with one ambitious goal in mind: to take over the world and make everyone his slaves. When En (Spaak), the Great Child – someone specialized in fighting against troublesome monsters – of World One, entrusts him with his Spirit and G.C. Watch, Baku embarks on an adventure through the twelve worlds to make his dream a reality at all costs.

Characters

Great Child
In the English version of the manga, the Enoki Films licensing, and other dubbed versions of the anime, their Japanese names are changed, while others retain their original name.
  / Bucky – 1st World (Primas)
  – 2nd World (Secandas)
  – 3rd World (Trius)
  – 4th World (Tetras)
  – 5th World (Pentas)
  – 6th World (Hexas)
  – 7th World (Seteras)
  – 8th World (Octas)
  – 9th World (Novas)
  – 10th World (Dicas)
  – 11th World (Undinus)
  – 12th World (Doidicus)

Great Soldier
  – 1st World
  – 2nd World
  – 3rd World
  – 12th World

Spirits
  – 1st World
  – 2nd World
  – 3rd World
  – 4th World
  – 5th World
  – 6th World
  – 7th World
  – 8th World
  – 9th World
  – 10th World
  – 11th World
  – 12th World

Enemies
  – main villain of anime series
 Troublemaking Monsters – normal monsters that become dangerous.

Monster-guides
 Chicky – monster-guide of Bucky, it is similar to a gigantic chick that grew suddenly. It was found in Rockside City.
 Pussycat – it is a gigantic cat, the monster-guide of Pinky.
 Manta – a purple gigantic ray, it is the monster-guide of Kai.
 Dick – a purple whale, it is Lucy's monster-guide.
 Dober – a gigantic dog and Jeanne's monster-guide.

Themes

Opening
 "Dare mo Shiranai Chizu de" by Yumi Matsuzawa

Ending
 "Last Tears (I Don't Cry Anymore, After You Left Me...)" by Two-Mix (episodes 1–14)
 "37°C Binetsu Senki" by M-Two (episodes 15–26)

References

External links
 

1998 manga
1999 anime television series debuts
2000 Japanese television series endings
Adventure anime and manga
Anime series based on manga
Enterbrain manga
Fantasy anime and manga
Shōnen manga
TV Tokyo original programming